Debra D. Plowman is an American politician and businesswoman from Maine. Plowman served as a Republican State Senator from Maine's 33rd District, representing western Penobscot County, including the population centers of Hampden, Dexter and Newburgh. She was first elected to the Maine State Senate in 2003 after serving from 1992 to 2000 in the Maine House of Representatives. Following the gaining of the Republican majority in the Maine State Senate in the November 2010 election, Plowman was elected Assistant Majority Leader by her colleagues. She also sought her Party's nomination for the US Senate following Olympia Snowe's retirement. She lost to Secretary of State Charlie Summers.

As a state senator, Plowman served on the Legal and Veterans Affairs Committee, and is a member of the Presiding Officers Select Committee on Ethics. Plowman serves on the civil justice committee of the conservative American Legislative Exchange Council (ALEC).

In 1993 as a state representative, Plowman helped design landmark child support reform. In 1999, Plowman unsuccessfully sought to reinstate capital punishment in Maine.

In March 2012, Plowman announced her candidacy for the Republican Party's nomination for U.S. Senator to replace the retiring Olympia Snowe. Plowman finished in sixth and last place in the Republican primary with 9% of the vote. Secretary of State Charlie Summers won the Republican primary.

References

External links
 Your Vote Profile: Republican U.S. Senate Candidate Debra Plowman Maine Public Broadcasting Network, May 4, 2012
 Project VoteSmart profile

Year of birth missing (living people)
Living people
Republican Party Maine state senators
Republican Party members of the Maine House of Representatives
People from Hampden, Maine
Businesspeople from Maine
Women state legislators in Maine
21st-century American politicians
21st-century American women politicians